KLAN or Klan may refer to:

 Klan TV, an Albanian TV channel
 KLAN (FM), an FM radio station licensed to Glasgow, Montana
 Klan (TV series), a Polish television series
 Klan (magazine), an Albanian political and business weekly
 "Klan" (song), a 2021 song by Italian singer Mahmood
 KLan or Kosovo LAN, an internet access provider based in Kosovo
 Klan Kosova, a Kosovan TV channel
 Capital Region International Airport, the Lansing, Michigan airport's ICAO code
 Klan, Ivory Coast, a defunct commune in Sassandra-Marahoué District, Ivory Coast
 Ku Klux Klan, a white supremacy group

See also
 Clan (disambiguation)
 Clansman (disambiguation)